Bismark de Araújo Ferreira (born 12 July 1993), known as just Bismark, is a Brazilian football player who currently plays as a winger.

Honours

Remo
Campeonato Paraense: 2015
Copa Verde runner-up: 2015

External links
 
 Bismark at ZeroZero

Living people
1993 births
Association football forwards
Brazilian footballers
Luverdense Esporte Clube players
Clube do Remo players
ABC Futebol Clube players
Najran SC players
Al-Qadsiah FC players
Khor Fakkan Sports Club players
Kuwait SC players
Place of birth missing (living people)
Brazilian expatriate sportspeople in Saudi Arabia
Expatriate footballers in Saudi Arabia
Expatriate footballers in the United Arab Emirates
Brazilian expatriate sportspeople in the United Arab Emirates
Brazilian expatriate sportspeople in Kuwait
Expatriate footballers in Kuwait
Saudi Professional League players
UAE Pro League players
Kuwait Premier League players